Adalia is a village and municipality in the province of Valladolid, Castile and León, central Spain.

Geography
This municipality is located in a vale. It belongs to the Comarca of Montes Torozos and borders San Cebrián de Mazote, Barruelo del Valle, Villasexmir, San Salvador, Gallegos de Hornija, Vega de Valdetronco, and Mota del Marqués municipalities.
The Retortero and Darzuela streams run across it, and its maximum altitude lies at mount Atalaya, with 830m.

History
The village was formerly walled. It was owned by the bishop of Palencia and the Order of San Juan. It was named Adella by the Order. The main activity two centuries ago was the harvesting of wheat and barley, as well as canvas bleaching.

Population

References

See also
Towns in Spain

Populated places in the Province of Valladolid